The Witches Cave is a 1989 science fantasy film from Gorky Film Studio, USSR and Barrandov Studios, Czechoslovakia.

The script was written by Kir Bulychov based upon his own story and directed by Yuri Moroz. The cast featured Sergei Zhigunov as Andrei Bruce, Marina Levtova as Belogurochka, Dmitry Pevtsov as Oktin Khash and Nikolai Karachentsov as cosmolinguist Jean. The movie had two nominations in 1991 Nika Awards.

Plot summary
An interstellar expedition is sent to study a strange planet far from Earth. Despite the fact that creatures from various Earth time periods appear to inhabit the world (mammoths, pterodactyls, dinosaurs, horses, birds, etc.), the stone-age-level natives also possess swords made of metal.

Cast
Sergey Zhigunov — Andrew Bruce, Inspector (voiced by Vladimir Antonik)
Nikolai Karachentsov — Jean Lemot, ethnographer, translator
Dmitry Pevtsov — Oktin-Hash, the leader of savages
Vyacheslav Kovalkov — Krylov, the astronaut
Marina Levtova — Billegurri (Belogurochka) - daughter and heiress of the leader of a friendly tribe
Igor Yasulovich — Konrad Zhmuda, ethnographer
Andrey Leonov - co-pilot
Anatoly Mambetov - Mute
Zhanna Prokhorenko - Ingrid Khan, paramedic
Willor Kuznetsov - The White Wolf
Sergei Bystritsky - Billegurri's brother 
Volodymyr Talashko - Axel, ethnographer
Leonid Filatkin - U-Ush, the last Neanderthal

References

External links
 

1989 films
1989 fantasy films
Films based on works by Kir Bulychov
Soviet science fiction films
1980s Russian-language films
Gorky Film Studio films
1989 in the Soviet Union
Films about dinosaurs
Pterosaurs in fiction
1980s science fiction films
Czechoslovak fantasy films
Slovak fantasy films
Czech science fiction films
Czech fantasy films
Films scored by Maksim Dunayevsky